Belief is a psychological state in which an individual holds a proposition or premise to be true.

Belief may also refer to:

In general
 Religious belief, a belief regarding the supernatural, sacred, or divine
 Belief in God
 Belief (sociology), an element of performance, in Erving Goffman's dramaturgical sociology

Music
 Belief (band), a Los Angeles based duo

Albums
 Belief (Nitzer Ebb album), a 1989 album by Nitzer Ebb
 Belief (Belief album), a 2022 album by Belief
 Belief, a 1996 album by Leon Parker

Songs
 "Belief"  (song), a 2006 song by John Mayer
 "Belief", a song by Gavin DeGraw from his 2003 album Chariot
 "Belief", a song by Neurosis from their 1999 album Times of Grace
 "Beliefs", a song by We Came as Romans from their 2009 album To Plant a Seed

Other uses
 "Belief" (short story), a story by Isaac Asimov from the collection Through a Glass, Clearly
 Belief (TV series), a documentary series hosted by Oprah Winfrey

See also

 List of belief systems
 Believe (disambiguation)
 Believer (disambiguation)
 I Believe (disambiguation)
 
 Belief bias
 False belief
 Non-belief
 Faith
 Opinion
 Trust (social sciences), reliance on another person or entity